North Topeka Baptist Church is a church building at 123 NW Gordon in Topeka, Kansas, United States.  It was added to the National Register of Historic Places in 2011.

It was built in 1921.  It survived a flood in 1951.

References

Baptist churches in Kansas
Churches on the National Register of Historic Places in Kansas
Churches in Topeka, Kansas
National Register of Historic Places in Topeka, Kansas